"Frodo Lives!" was a popular counterculture slogan in the 1960s and 1970s, referring to the character Frodo Baggins from J. R. R. Tolkien's fantasy novel The Lord of the Rings, commonly associated with the hippie movement.

The phrase was used frequently in graffiti, buttons, bumper-stickers, T-shirts, and other materials. It was the title of a 1967 single released under the band name "The Magic Ring" by Smash Records. It was later displayed during the activation of a computer virus in the early 1990s, in large letters with a moving border.

The term first became popular following release of the Ballantine Books paperback edition of the books in 1965, exposing them to a larger number of readers. While no longer as pervasive as it once was, the term continues to appear in newspaper articles and popular culture related to Tolkien's stories, and was used in merchandising items for the early-2000s New Line Cinema The Lord of the Rings film trilogy.

References

English phrases
Hippie movement
Tolkien fandom
Slogans
1960s fads and trends
1960s neologisms